Science and Conscience is a Canadian current affairs television miniseries which aired on CBC Television in 1968.

Premise
Each episode consisted of a panel discussion on a particular topic of technology, science and ethics as hosted by Patrick Watson.

Scheduling
This half-hour series was broadcast on Thursdays at 10:30 p.m. (Eastern time) from 23 May to 11 July 1968.

23 May 1968: "Turn A Blind Eye", concerning the relationships of the scientific community with governments, businesses and citizens, with panellists Jacob Bronowski, James Eayrs, and Malcolm Muggeridge
30 May 1968: "Building Better Babies", with panellists William Edwin Beckel, Malcolm Muggeridge and Margaret Thompson
6 June 1968: "Color Me Different", concerning distinctions of ethnicity, nationality and race
13 June 1968: "Kill And Overkill", about the atomic arms race, with panellists Norman Alcock, Ralph Lapp, John Polyani
20 June 1968: "Man on the Moon", with panellists Walter Goldschmidt, Donald Ivey and Ralph Lapp
27 June 1968: "Learn, Baby, Learn", concerning whether academic degrees should have time limits, with panellists A. J. Ayer, David Bates and Donald Ivey
4 July 1968: "Should They Or Shouldn't They?", concerning euthanasia, with panellists A. J. Ayer, Elie Cass and Peter Rechnitzer
11 July 1968: "Bend, Staple, And Mutilate", concerning government use of technology for surveillance of citizens, with panellists Jacob Bronowski, James Eayrs, and Malcolm Muggeridge

References

External links
 

CBC Television original programming
1968 Canadian television series debuts
1968 Canadian television series endings